Ras Munif (Arabic: رأس منيف ) is a town located in the Gilead hills of Northern Jordan in the Ajloun Governorate. The town lies in an area with some of the most fertile land in the Kingdom and due to that it has a population of mainly farmers or falah in Arabic. Ras Munif has some ruins of old houses that are approximately 200 years old in its western side. The town had a population of about 2047 residents according to the last census in 2015.

References

Populated places in Ajloun Governorate
Gilead